The grey-capped cicadabird or Melanesian cicadabird (Edolisoma remotum) is a species of bird in the family Campephagidae. It is endemic to the Bismarck Archipelago. It was previously considered conspecific with the common cicadabird (E. tenuirostre).

There are 5 subspecies recognized:

 E. r. remotum Sharpe, 1878 - New Ireland, Dyaul, Lavongai, and the Feni Islands
 E. r. ultimum (Mayr, 1955) - Tabar, Lihir, and the Tanga Islands
 E. r. saturatius Rothschild & Hartert, E., 1902 - Buka to Bougainville and the New Georgia Islands 
 E. r. nisorium Mayr, 1950 - Russell Islands
 E. r. erythropygium Sharpe, 1888 - Guadalcanal, Savo, Malaita & Ulawa, and the Nggela Islands

The subspecies E. r. nisorium was formerly classified within the common cicadabird, but this classification was found to be erroneous by the International Ornithological Congress in 2022.

Its natural habitat is subtropical or tropical moist lowland forests.

References

grey-capped cicadabird
grey-capped cicadabird